Robert Johnson, a Shropshire native, was a Catholic priest and martyr during the reign of Elizabeth I.

Life
Robert Johnson had grown up in one of the four parishes of Claverley, Hales, Owen or Worfield in what was then the Anglican Diocese of Worcester. He joined the German College in Rome on 1 October 1571.  In his youth he was a servant in a gentleman's household. He was ordained a priest in Brussels from the English College, Douai. After a pilgrimage to Rome in 1579 he returned to England in 1580, was arrested on 12 July and put in the Tower on 5 December.  Johnson was racked on 16 December and put in a dungeon until his trial on 14 November 1581.

Johnson was one of 19 priests who stood trial with St Edmund Campion in Westminster Hall in the late autumn of 1581. They were charged with treason under an Act of 1351 that did not pertain to religion but to a fictitious conspiracy against the Queen known as the "Plot of Rome and Rheims". The purpose was to send out the message that the priests were not condemned for their faith but for conspiring against the Queen, an accusation which they adamantly denied. He was subsequently condemned on 20 November and executed along with Thomas Ford and John Shert on 28 May 1582. Johnson was the last to die, after being forced to watch the quartering of Shert. Johnson began to pray in Latin and was bidden by a minister to "Pray as Christ taught." Johnson answered, "What! Do you think Christ taught in English?"  All three were beatified in 1889.

See also
 Douai Martyrs

References

1582 deaths
English College, Douai alumni
Executed people from Shropshire
English beatified people
16th-century English Roman Catholic priests
Martyred Roman Catholic priests
People executed under Elizabeth I
16th-century Roman Catholic martyrs
16th-century venerated Christians
Year of birth unknown
Forty-one Martyrs of England and Wales